Nicholas VanCuran Johnson (born December 24, 1985) is a Canadian former professional ice hockey forward who played in the National Hockey League (NHL)  with the Pittsburgh Penguins, Minnesota Wild and the Phoenix Coyotes.

Playing career
He was drafted by the Pittsburgh Penguins 67th overall in the 2004 NHL Entry Draft. Before being drafted, Johnson played for the St. Albert Saints of the Alberta Junior Hockey League. After graduating high school and being drafted, Johnson played four seasons with Dartmouth of ECAC Hockey in the NCAA. Following his final season at Dartmouth, Johnson signed a two-year, entry-level contract with the Penguins on March 25, 2008. He shortly began his professional career with affiliate the Wilkes-Barre/Scranton Penguins of the American Hockey League.

In the 2009–10 season, Johnson scored his first career NHL goal in his NHL debut on January 21, 2010, with the Penguins against the Washington Capitals. He played in 6 games with the Pittsburgh before returning the Wilkes-Barre. On June 7, 2010, he was re-signed to a one-year contract with the Penguins.

On September 29, 2011, Johnson was claimed off waivers by the Minnesota Wild. In the 2011–12 season, Johnson earned a regular checking line role on the Wild, playing in a career high 77 games to recorded 8 goals and 26 points.

Despite his successful season with the Wild, Johnson was released as a free agent and on July 11, 2012, he was signed on a one-year, two-way deal with the Phoenix Coyotes. With the NHL lockout in effect, Johnson signed for a brief stint with the Idaho Steelheads of the ECHL. Upon conclusion of the lockout he was assigned to AHL affiliate, the Portland Pirates. He was later recalled by the Coyotes in the shortened 2012–13 season and appeared in 17 games for the Coyotes before on March 13, 2013, he was put on waivers and reassigned to Portland.

On July 5, 2013, Johnson was signed to a one-year, two-way contract with the Boston Bruins.

On July 9, 2014, Johnson left the Bruins organization after one season and signed his first contract abroad on a one-year deal with the Växjö Lakers of the Swedish Hockey League.

Career statistics

Awards and honors

References

External links

1985 births
Boston Bruins players
Brynäs IF players
Canadian expatriate ice hockey players in Sweden
Canadian ice hockey right wingers
Dartmouth Big Green men's ice hockey players
Idaho Steelheads (ECHL) players
Living people
Minnesota Wild players
Phoenix Coyotes players
Pittsburgh Penguins draft picks
Pittsburgh Penguins players
Portland Pirates players
Providence Bruins players
Ice hockey people from Calgary
St. Albert Saints players
Växjö Lakers players
Wheeling Nailers players
Wilkes-Barre/Scranton Penguins players